Nijlen is a municipality located in the Belgian province of Antwerp. In 2021, Nijlen had a total population of 22,985. The total area is 39.09 km2.

History 
In 1770, a hoard of golden coins dating from Julius Caesar to Titus Flavius Domitianus was discovered. Nijlen was first mentioned in 1146 as having possessions of Tongerlo Abbey. The village was damaged during the Reformation and nearly depopulated. In the 18th century, there was a population increase which accelerated after the railway station on the line from Antwerp to Herentals opened in 1853. Around 1875, diamond industry started in Nijlen which became the second most importance centre for diamonds after Antwerp in Belgium.

Notable inhabitants
 Libera Carlier (b. Nijlen, 19 January 1926 – 25 April 2007)
 Jozef Van Hove (b. Berchem, 16 November 1919)

Gallery

References

External links

Official website - Available only in Dutch

Municipalities of Antwerp Province
Populated places in Antwerp Province